Iridium(III) chloride is the inorganic compound with the formula IrCl3.  The anhydrous compound is relatively rare, but the related hydrate is useful for preparing other iridium compounds. The anhydrous salt is a dark green crystalline solid. More commonly encountered is the trihydrate IrCl3(H2O)3.

Preparation
Iridium is  separated from the other platinum group metals as crystalline ammonium hexachloroiridate, (NH4)2[IrCl6], which can be reduced to iridium metal in a stream of hydrogen. The spongy Ir thus produced reacts with chlorine at 300–400 °C to give iridium(III) chloride.

Hydrated iridium trichloride is obtained by heating hydrated iridium(III) oxide with hydrochloric acid.

Structure
Like the related rhodium compound, IrCl3 adopts the structure seen for aluminium chloride. This is the monoclinic α polymorph. A rhombohedral β polymorph also exists. Both polymorphs have effectively the same anion lattice but differ in the octahedral interstices the iridium ions occupy.

Uses
Industrially, most iridium complexes are generated from ammonium hexachloroiridate or the related chloroiridic acid (H2IrCl6) as these salts are the most common commercial forms of iridium chlorides.

Hydrated iridium(III) chloride is used in the laboratory for the preparation of other iridium compounds such as Vaska's complex, trans-[IrCl(CO)(PPh3)2]. Alkene complexes such as cyclooctadiene iridium chloride dimer and chlorobis(cyclooctene)iridium dimer can also be prepared by heating the trichloride with the appropriate alkene in water/alcohol mixtures.

Safety
Iridium(III) chloride is not listed under Annex I of Directive 67/548/EEC, but is listed in the inventory of the Toxic Substances Control Act (TSCA).

References

Chlorides
Iridium compounds
Platinum group halides